Gilsey Mansion is a historic home located at Huntington in Suffolk County, New York. It is a large, seven-bay, two-story clapboard, T-shaped residence with a hipped roof, built about 1900 in the Colonial Revival style.  A four-bay, two-story gable-roofed wing projects to the rear.  It features a porte cochere on tapered Doric order columns and a pedimented portico.

It was added to the National Register of Historic Places in 1985.

References

Houses on the National Register of Historic Places in New York (state)
Houses completed in 1900
Houses in Suffolk County, New York
National Register of Historic Places in Suffolk County, New York
1900 establishments in New York (state)